Rodríguez is a district of the Sarchí canton, in the Alajuela province of Costa Rica.

History 
Rodríguez was created on 10 December 1971 by Decreto Ejecutivo 2101-G. Segregated from Sarchí Norte.

Geography 
Rodríguez has an area of  km² and an elevation of  metres.

Demographics 

For the 2011 census, Rodríguez had a population of  inhabitants.

Transportation

Road transportation 
The district is covered by the following road routes:
 National Route 710

References 

Districts of Alajuela Province
Populated places in Alajuela Province